The Sri Lanka Muslim Congress (Sri Lanka Muslim Kongrasaya) is a political party in Sri Lanka. It is currently the largest party representing the Muslim community of Sri Lanka.

History
The party was formed at a meeting held at Kalmunai in 1981 by a small study group of local Eastern Province political leaders. The group was pioneered by Congress Leader, M. H. M. Ashraff.

Ideology 
According to their official website, the SLMC is a political party that is totally focused on giving voice to the Muslim minority of Sri Lanka, which makes up 8% of the island's population. The party is centered around Islam, but is committed to foster multiracial amity and collective prosperity for all Sri Lankan citizens. It firmly believes that Sri Lankan Muslims can be equal partners in Sri Lanka's path to economic development and improvement in the general quality of life in Sri Lanka in the 21st century.

See also

Category:Sri Lanka Muslim Congress politicians

References

External links
 https://slmc.lk

 
1981 establishments in Sri Lanka
Islamic political parties in Sri Lanka
Political parties established in 1981
Political parties in Sri Lanka
United National Front (Sri Lanka)